Urophora misakiana is a species of tephritid or fruit flies in the genus Urophora of the family Tephritidae.

Distribution
Japan.

References

Urophora
Insects described in 1916
Diptera of Asia
Taxa named by Shōnen Matsumura